WebDialogs, Inc. was  founded in 1998 in Billerica, Massachusetts and provides online meeting and communication solutions.

On August 22, 2007, IBM acquired WebDialogs, Inc. for an undisclosed amount.

See also
List of mergers and acquisitions by IBM

References

IBM acquisitions
Technology companies established in 1998
Companies based in Billerica, Massachusetts